The Iroquois County State Wildlife Area is an Illinois state park that occupies  in northeastern Iroquois County, near the border with Indiana.  The nearest municipality is Beaverville, Illinois, and the nearest exit on a limited-access highway is Exit 302 on Interstate 57 (Chebanse, Illinois).

Ecology
The Iroquois County State Wildlife Area is a surviving remnant of the Great Kankakee Swamp, a 5,300 sq mi (14,000 km²) expanse of wetland that once drained the slow-flowing Kankakee River valley.  The glacial melt episode that marked the conclusion of the Wisconsonian glaciation washed a fan of sand, silt, and sediments westward from Northwest Indiana into Northeastern Illinois, and this outwash plain, which remained damp or wet year-round, became the home of a significant quantity of habitat-specific wetland plants and insects.

History
The Kankakee Swamp wetlands were the home of many beaver and other fur-bearing mammals, which led to the nearby locality being incorporated as the municipality of Beaverville.  The nearby towns of Chebanse and St. Anne pay tribute to the area's French-Canadian fur-trading heritage.

During the great drainage of the Kankakee Swamp, starting in the late 19th century, ditches were dug all over eastern Iroquois County to drain the outwash plain.  While most of the ditched land became fertile farmland, the sands of far-northeastern Iroquois County resisted profitable farming activity.

In 1944 a predecessor agency of the Illinois Department of Natural Resources (IDNR) began to acquire the land of the future Iroquois County State Wildlife Area.  The population of the greater prairie chicken had crashed in Illinois, and the state hoped the flagship species could be induced to rebuild a breeding population in the new sanctuary.

Today
Attempts in the 20th century to reintroduce the greater prairie chicken to northeastern Iroquois County failed.  State naturalists believe the wildlife area is too wet to be a good home for this species.  The IDNR adaptively reused the failed prairie-chicken ground as a place to hunt whitetail deer, doves, pheasants, quail, rabbits, and squirrels.  These game activities continue in their respective hunting seasons.

The Iroquois County State Wildlife Area is today a mosaic of sand dunes and wet prairie habitats.  The juxtaposition of the sand and wetland has created a rolling savanna landscape of trees and grass, classified as an oak barren.  The dominant oak tree is the black oak, often found on relatively infertile, sandy ground.  The black-oak savanna is one of the largest native grassland remnants in Illinois.  Prairie forbs include the blazing star and hairy puccoon.

See also
 Willow Slough Fish and Wildlife Area, an adjacent state park across the line in Indiana

References

External links

State parks of Illinois
Protected areas of Iroquois County, Illinois
Protected areas established in 1944
1944 establishments in Illinois